Adana Science and Technology University (Adana STU) or in Turkish: Adana Bilim ve Teknoloji Üniversitesi (Adana BTU), is a public university located in Adana, Turkey. Although the university is newly constructed, it is considered one of the leading universities in the region with its technological infrastructure. The university is focused on both scientific research and education in engineering and natural sciences.

External links

Universities and colleges in Turkey
Education in Adana
State universities and colleges in Turkey
Buildings and structures in Adana
Educational institutions established in 2011
2011 establishments in Turkey